Nathaniel Simonds (1775–1850) was a U.S. politician from Missouri.

Simonds was born in Windsor, Vermont, and settled in St. Charles, Missouri in February, 1801. Prior to becoming State Treasurer of Missouri, he served as Sheriff of St. Charles County, Missouri, and pursued business ventures including operating a tavern in St. Charles, and a stage and mail coach route between St. Charles and St. Louis

In September, 1821, he was appointed as the second State Treasurer of Missouri. Following his retirement as state treasurer in 1829, he settled in Lincoln County, Missouri. He died in Troy, Missouri, on April 20, 1850.

References
 Missouri State Treasurer-Past Treasurer Biography

1775 births
1850 deaths
State treasurers of Missouri
Missouri sheriffs
Missouri Democratic-Republicans
People from St. Charles, Missouri
People from Troy, Missouri
People from Windsor, Vermont